The Colombian mountain grackle (Macroagelaius subalaris), is a species of bird in the family Icteridae.

Distribution and habitat
It is endemic to Colombia where its natural habitat is subtropical or tropical moist montane forests.

Conservation
It is threatened by habitat loss and declining in numbers. It was uplisted from Near Threatened to Critically Endangered status in 2000, due to fears of a collapse of the presumably tiny population. As the species, while still severely declining, has turned out to be more widespread than believed, it was downlisted to Endangered in the 2007 IUCN Red List.

References

Sources
 BirdLife International (2007a): 2006-2007 Red List status changes, Retrieved 26 August 2007
 BirdLife International (2007b): Mountain Grackle - BirdLife Species Factsheet. Retrieved 28 August 2007

Colombian mountain grackle
Birds of the Colombian Andes
Endemic birds of Colombia
Colombian mountain grackle
Taxonomy articles created by Polbot